is a railway station in the city of  Toyohashi, Aichi Prefecture, Japan, operated by the Public–private partnership Toyohashi Railroad.

Lines
Koike Station is a station of the Atsumi Line, and is located 1.7 kilometers from the starting point of the line at Shin-Toyohashi Station.

Station layout
The station has two opposed side platforms connected by a level crossing. The station is unattended.

Adjacent stations

|-
!colspan=5|Toyohashi Railroad

Station history
Koike Station was established on May 1, 1925 as a station on the privately held Atsumi Railroad. On September 1, 1940, the Atsumi Railway became part of the Nagoya Railway system, and was spun out again as the Toyohashi Railway on October 1, 1954. The station has been unattended since June 1978.

Passenger statistics
In fiscal 2017, the station was used by an average of 904 passengers daily.

Surrounding area
Ito Hospital
Japan National Route 259

See also
 List of railway stations in Japan

References

External links

Toyohashi Railway Official home page

Railway stations in Aichi Prefecture
Railway stations in Japan opened in 1925
Toyohashi